The 1999 Davidoff Swiss Indoors was a men's tennis tournament played on indoor carpet courts. It was the 30th edition of the event known that year as the Davidoff Swiss Indoors, and was part of the World of the 1999 ATP Tour. It took place at the St. Jakobshalle in Basel, Switzerland, from 3 October through 10 October 1999. Unseeded Karol Kučera won the singles title.

Finals

Singles

 Karol Kučera defeated  Tim Henman 6–4, 7–6(12–10), 4–6, 4–6, 7–6(7–2)
 It was Kučera's 1st title of the year and the 5th of his career.

Doubles

 Brent Haygarth /  Aleksandar Kitinov defeated  Jiří Novák /  David Rikl, 0–6, 6–4, 7–5
 It was Haygarth's 1st title of the year and the 6th of his career. It was Kitinov's 1st title of the year and the 2nd of his career.

References

External links
 Official website 
 ATP tournament profile
 ITF tournament edition details

 
Davidoff Swiss Indoors
Swiss Indoors